The Ricker model, named after Bill Ricker, is a classic discrete population model which gives the expected number N t+1 (or density) of individuals in generation t + 1 as a function of the number of individuals in the previous generation,

 

Here r is interpreted as an intrinsic growth rate and k as the carrying capacity of the environment. The Ricker model was introduced in 1954 by Ricker in the context of stock and recruitment in fisheries.

The model can be used to predict the number of fish that will be present in a fishery. Subsequent work has derived the model under other assumptions such as scramble competition, within-year resource limited competition or even as the outcome of source-sink Malthusian patches linked by density-dependent dispersal. The Ricker model is a limiting case of the Hassell model which takes the form

 

When c = 1, the Hassell model is simply the Beverton–Holt model.

See also
 Population dynamics of fisheries

Notes

References
 Brännström A and Sumpter DJ (2005) "The role of competition and clustering in population dynamics" Proc Biol Sci., 272(1576): 2065–72.
 Bravo de la Parra, R., Marvá, M., Sánchez, E. and Sanz, L. (2013) Reduction of discrete dynamical systems with applications to dynamics population models. Math Model Nat Phenom. 8(6). pp 107–129
 Geritz SA and Kisdi E (2004). "On the mechanistic underpinning of discrete-time population models with complex dynamics".  J Theor Biol., 21 May 2004;228(2):261–9.
 Noakes, David L. G. (Ed.) (2006) Bill Ricker: an appreciation シュプリンガー・ジャパン株式会社, .
 Ricker, W. E. (1954) Stock and Recruitment Journal of the Fisheries Research Board of Canada, 11(5): 559–623. 
 Ricker, W. E. (1975) Computation and Interpretation of Biological Statistics of Fish Populations. Bulletin of the Fisheries Research Board of Canada, No 119. Ottawa.

Demography
Stochastic models